Cyclohexane-1,2-dione hydrolase is an enzyme with systematic name cyclohexane-1,2-dione acylhydrolase (decyclizing). This enzyme catalyses the following chemical reaction

 cyclohexane-1,2-dione + H2O  6-oxohexanoate

This enzyme is highly specific.

References

External links 

EC 3.7.1